Darien is a city in DuPage County, Illinois, United States. Per the 2020 census, the population was 22,011. A southwestern suburb of Chicago, Darien was named after the town of Darien, Connecticut. Darien is just north of I-55 and Historic U.S. Route 66 (now Frontage Road). The entire south edge of the town borders Waterfall Glen.

History
The first people to settle in Darien came from New England via the Erie Canal and Great Lakes. Among the first to arrive was the Andres Neiman, the Rapones, and the Capra family. They settled along an old stagecoach line in 1835. Andres served as Justice of the Peace, Town Clerk, and Assessor Mr. Capra was the Dog Catcher, and County Commissioner. He also established the Capra Inn, near what is currently the intersection of Lemont Road and I-55; the inn served the 15 stagecoaches that traveled the stagecoach line, and included a tavern and a post office. Andres named the area "Cass".

Andres and Father Beggs along with Louis Capra Sr. built the First Cass Church, which was a log cabin.  The church was also used as a school house.

Elisha and Eliza Smart settled in Cass in 1838 with their ten children. Elisha joined the Gold Rush and went to California, returning seven years later a very rich man. He bought more land and donated it for the construction of a new Cass Church in 1870. His brother, William Smart, donated land for the creation of Cass Cemetery.

John and Hannah Oldfield came to Cass in 1850.

In 1881, a man named Franklin Blanchard opened a cheese factory. The factory was eventually moved or closed; a McDonald's restaurant now occupies the factory's original location.

Martin B. Madden arrived with his parents in the Cass area in 1869 from England. In 1878 he married the youngest daughter of Elisha and Eliza Smart at her parents' house in Cass. In 1903, Mr. Madden built a home to look like the White House in Washington D.C. he called it Castle Eden. Today Castle Eden is part of the Aylesford Retreat Center of the Carmelite Fathers.

A group of German Lutherans from Europe came to the area near 67th and Clarendon Hills Road in 1859. They built the first St. John Lutheran Church and laid out the cemetery behind the church. Today the cemetery is still located at 67th and Clarendon Hills Road. In 1899, a new church was built on the northeast corner of Cass and 75th Street. The Church was located where the Taco Bell and Buona Beef Restaurant now stand. In 1969, the second church was torn down and the present St. John's Lutheran Church was built by Louis Capra Jr., west of Cass Ave and north of 75th Street.

A school was built on the northwest corner of Cass and 75th street in 1860. It was the first Lace School. It burned down in 1924, and was replaced with the present building. It is now a museum which is open on the first Sunday of each month from 2:00pm to 4:00pm.

By 1890, the Village of Lace was established. The important location at that time was the triangle bordered by Cass Avenue, Plainfield Road and 75th Street. It was called "The Point". The Point included the Town Hall, General Store, the Capra Blacksmith Shop and the office of Dr. Roe. A Post Office had been established by the Rapones at The Point in 1884.

The future city of Darien was originally part of the Lace and Cass communities. As nearby Downers Grove began to expand in the 1960's, it's city street grid began to extend into unincorporated areas past it's southern borders. Residents of the Marion Hills, Brookhaven, Farmingdale and Hinsbrook subdivisions wanted to incorporate as a single city; this finally happened in 1969. When the incorporation committee reached an impasse on an acceptable name for the new city, acting mayor Sam Kelly suggested the name "Darien". He had visited Darien, Connecticut, and found it to be a very pleasant and attractive community. Today, Darien is known as "A Nice Place to Live", in honor of the city's founding year 1969. Darien in Illinois is pronounced with the accent on the first syllable; Darien in Connecticut is pronounced with the accent on the last syllable.

Around 11pm on June 20, 2021, a large, violent EF3 tornado tore through several neighborhoods of Woodridge, and then into Darien. The tornado first formed in southern Naperville, causing 6 injuries, and 2 in critical condition. After the tornado crossed IL 53, it entered Woodridge, on top of 83rd St. The tornado at this point was nearing peak width, at or near 1/4 to 1/2 mile wide. The tornado then crossed I-355, and reached peak strength not too long later. The tornado reached a peak size of 0.25 - 0.5 miles wide with a debris ball around 2 miles wide. The tornado at this point was starting to enter Darien, causing even more damage there. The tornado crossed I-55 near the IL 83 interchange not too long later. At around 11:35pm, the tornado roped out in the southwest Chicago suburb of Willow Springs.

Geography

Darien's City Hall used to be totally underground until 1994, when it was lifted up. Now only 75% is underground. Darien's City Hall is surrounded on three sides by the village of Downers Grove.

The entire south edge of Darien backs up to Waterfall Glen Forest Preserve, which is home to one of the only old-growth, pine wood forests in the area. It also offers a 773-acre "Bluff savanna", with hiking trails, horseback trails and boat access to the nearby Des Plaines River. The Rocky Glen Waterfall, located within the preserve, is a popular swimming destination in the summer. Darien is bordered by the cities of Downers Grove, Westmont, Woodridge, Lemont, and Willowbrook, and it has easy access to the three major thoroughfares crossing Chicago's southwest suburbs: Interstate 55, Interstate 355, and Interstate 294.

Demographics
As of the 2020 census there were 22,011 people, 8,697 households, and 6,297 families residing in the city. The racial makeup of the city was 74.28% White, 3.40% African American, 0.23% Native American, 13.09% Asian, 0.07% Pacific Islander, 2.39% from other races, and 6.55% from two or more races. Hispanic or Latino of any race were 8.40% of the population.

There were 8,697 households, out of which 42.58% had children under the age of 18 living with them, 56.53% were married couples living together, 10.08% had a female householder with no husband present, and 27.60% were non-families. 23.31% of all households were made up of individuals, and 11.29% had someone living alone who was 65 years of age or older. The average household size was 2.98 and the average family size was 2.51.

The city's age distribution consisted of 17.9% under the age of 18, 7.3% from 18 to 24, 25% from 25 to 44, 28.3% from 45 to 64, and 21.4% who were 65 years of age or older. The median age was 44.9 years. For every 100 females, there were 100.8 males. For every 100 females age 18 and over, there were 99.3 males.

The median income for a household in the city was $100,771, and the median income for a family was $113,415. Males had a median income of $59,394 versus $44,771 for females. The per capita income for the city was $49,892. About 3.8% of families and 5.0% of the population were below the poverty line, including 7.4% of those under age 18 and 6.0% of those age 65 or over.

Note: the US Census treats Hispanic/Latino as an ethnic category. This table excludes Latinos from the racial categories and assigns them to a separate category. Hispanics/Latinos can be of any race.

Education
Hinsdale Township High School District 86 operates Hinsdale South High School in Darien. Part of Darien also attends Downers Grove South High School.
Eisenhower Junior High School and Cass Junior High School operate in Darien along with Lace Elementary School, Mark-DeLay Elementary School, Concord Elementary School, and Elizabeth Ide Elementary School.

Local Private Schools include Our Lady of Peace and Kingswood Academy (prior to eighth grade).

Notable people 

 Rudy Fratto (born 1943), alleged high-ranking member of the Chicago Outfit
 Doug Lussenhop (born 1973), musician, video editor, and comedian associated with comedy duo Tim & Eric
 Manu Raju, journalist
 Barbara Alyn Woods (born 1962), actress from One Tree Hill and Honey, I Shrunk the Kids

See also
National Shrine of St Therese

Notes

External links

 City of Darien

 
Chicago metropolitan area
Cities in Illinois
Populated places established in 1835
Cities in DuPage County, Illinois
1835 establishments in Illinois